The  Synchroidae are a small family of tenebrionoid beetles with no vernacular common name. The family consists of three extant genera, Mallodrya, Synchroa, and Synchroina, with a total of nine species., which are found in North America, East Asia and Southeast Asia. The larvae of species of Synchroa are known to feed on rotting cambium tissue found in deciduous trees, with adults being nocturnal. Most Synchroidae have been found to be within 10.0-13.00 mm in length.

References 

Tenebrionoidea
Beetle families